OperaWorks is an opera training program, founded by program director Ann Baltz, and conducted in Northridge, California, USA.

Description

OperaWorks is a training program for singers and instructors working in the field of classical music. Accepting a limited number of students selected each year from up to eight cities across the United States, the program operates from the beginning of June and runs through the end of July, annually. OperaWorks was founded in 1987 by classical pianist Ann Baltz as a response to what she saw as the myopic tendencies of conventional operatic training. Baltz envisioned a new approach to the training of vocalists, in which the "total instrument" would be addressed, not just the voice itself. Over the years, her program has expanded to include instruction in movement, Yoga, acting, visualization, conducting, improvisation and the Alexander technique, as well as career management.

Borrowing to some degree from teaching techniques long utilized in contemporary theatrical training, OperaWorks strives to free the individual vocal artist in such a manner that the physical conventions and artifice of opera performance can fall away, hopefully revealing something altogether truer to life itself. Recognizing the uniqueness of each individual artist, OperaWorks endeavors to develop singers from the inside out, thus enabling them to trust their own instincts – musically, emotionally, dramatically.

In 2006, Baltz invited independent filmmaker Brad Mays to spend an entire summer filming the various classes and events at OperaWorks. The results are to be seen in the documentary feature film SING*ularity.

Notable alumni
 Grammy Awards: Hila Plitmann, Priti Gandhi, Jessica Rivera
 Metropolitan Opera: Julie Makerov, Jessica Rivera, Rebecca Ringle, Michael Chioldi, Ashley Emerson, Robert McPherson
 New York City Opera: Raymond Ayers, Randall Scotting, Priti Gandhi, Basia Revi, Rebecca Ringle
 Los Angeles Opera: Michael Chioldi, Erica Wueschner, Priti Gandhi
 Solo Pop recording artist: Arden Kaywin

References

External links

Ann Baltz in residence at AU’s School of Music at Anderson University (Indiana) (14 November 2007)
IndiWire article about "SING*ularity" (OperaWorks)
OperaWorks at answers.com
SING*ularity at Turner Classic Movies (TCM)

Opera organizations
Music education in the United States
Summer camps in California
Arts organizations established in 1987
1987 establishments in California